Kor Royal Cup, known as the Yai Cup until 1963, was the highest level of club football competition which competed in the tournament in Thailand from 1916 to 1995. It was founded by the Football Association of Thailand in 1916. Department of Performing Arts was the first team that won this competition.

In 1996, Thai League 1 was formed by the Football Association of Thailand to act as the top professional football league in place of Kor Royal cup. For this Reason, Kor Royal Cup has been adapted to be the trophy contested annually between the champions and the runners-up of Thai Premier League up to 2009.

Since 2010, the trophy has been changed to be annual super cup competitions  at the beginning of each season between Thai League 1 champions and Thai FA Cup champions. From 2017 onward, the national Super cup competition between the champions of Thai League 1 and the those of Thai FA Cup has become Thailand Champions Cup.

Since 2016, After Somyot Poompanmoung won the election and became the president of the Football Association in February 2016, the new Association decided to promote the Kor Royal Cup trophy from the Super cup to be the reward of the Thai League 1 champions. The Kor Royal Cup has returned as the top level trophy again since it was the highest level of club football competition which competed in the tournament in Thailand from 1916 to 1995, but in the end of season he decide not to used this trophy for the reward of the Thai League 1 champions.

Championship history

2010–2016
The trophy is contested in an annual match between the champions of the Thai League 1 and the champions of the Thai FA Cup.

1996–2009
The trophy contested in an annual match between the champions and the runners-up of Thai Premier League (the competition form may be adjusted in some seasons).

1916–1995
The top level of club football competition.

See also 
 Thai Premier League
 Thai football records and statistics

References

External links
Thailand - List of Cup Winners, RSSSF.com

National association football supercups
Football cup competitions in Thailand
Recurring events established in 1916
1916 establishments in Siam